A bronze statue of the British singer Amy Winehouse is located in the Stables Market in Camden Town, in north London. Sculpted by Scott Eaton, it was unveiled in 2014, three years after the singer's death.

Description and history
Amy Winehouse (1983–2011) was a British singer and songwriter who had become strongly associated with Camden Town until her death in 2011. Winehouse died at her nearby Camden Square home of alcohol poisoning on 23 July 2011. The singer's statue also wears a Star of David necklace and on the day of the unveiling had a real red rose in her hair. The charcoal grey work was created by the British sculptor Scott Eaton, who said that it had been designed to convey Winehouse's "attitude and strength, but also give subtle hints of insecurity".

Scott Eaton had gained the commission after showing his ideas to Winehouse's father. The sculpture was not meant to reflect a particular picture or outfit but it was intended to capture an amalgamation of her appearances. The sculptor drew attention to the position of her arms where one hand rests on her hip and the other holds the edge of her skirt. Small details like this and the way the figure's foot turn inwards were intended to give a "personality" to the statue.

The statue's original intended location was in the Roundhouse music venue in nearby Chalk Farm, but due to poor public accessibility at that site the work was instead erected in the Stables Market. It was unveiled by Winehouse's friend, the British actress Barbara Windsor, in the presence of Winehouse's parents, Mitch and Janis Winehouse, on 14 September 2014, which would have been the singer's 31st birthday.

Reception
The reviews of the statue were positive although one commentator said it was "apparently designed in her likeness". The council had made an exception in allowing the statue as subjects for sculpture are normally expected to have died at least twenty years ago. Mitch Winehouse, who had approved the sculptor, said that "Amy was in love with Camden and it is the place her fans from all over the world associate her with." Mitch Winehouse also said that the sight of the statue was "incredibly emotional" and that it was "like stopping her in a beautiful moment in time ... We really hope Amy's fans love the statue."

Winehouse's mother, Janis, said that "I am pleased with how the statue turned out because you can see that it's Amy ... Camden is Amy's place, it's where she belongs." Windsor said that "I've had many honours throughout my career, but this is the greatest honour ... I was one of the fortunate people who got to know Amy in the last few years of her too short life. Not only was she one of the greatest talents that this country has ever produced, she was a warm, lovely kind and fun lady ... Amy loved Camden with a passion and Camden loved her so it's only right her presence should remain here."

See also
 2014 in art
 List of public art in Camden

References

2014 establishments in England
2014 in London
2014 sculptures
Amy Winehouse
Bronze sculptures in the United Kingdom
Camden Town
Winehouse, Amy
Winehouse, Amy
Winehouse, Amy
Winehouse, Amy
Monuments and memorials in London
Winehouse, Amy
Winehouse, Amy
Winehouse, Amy
Winehouse, Amy